Sudha Pennathur (born in Chennai, India) is an Indian jewelry, scarf, holiday ornaments, & art objects designer and entrepreneur. Pennathur designs and brings Indian inspired jewellery and crafts to the American Market. Daughter of Dr. Krish Pennathur, noted Indian author of productivity and business management books.

Education
Pennathur studied commerce at Mumbai's Sydenham College, Pace University, Business Administration at Columbia University, MBA at University of Washington

Business approach

Pennathur has sought to keep the art of Indian Craftsmanship alive by employing local artisans to create jewelry, clothing and decorator items. Pennathur wanted to match American consumers' tastes with the skills of India's deep reserves of artisan labor. (This is in contrast to factory produced goods.)

Career

Pennathur started her own business, Sudha Pennathur LP, in 1985.  Pennathur was formerly employed by Levi Strauss and Carter Hawley Hale Stores. She also has worked at Carson Pirie and Scott & The Bon Marche.

Achievements

Worked with Indian Government to reduce red tape involved in exportation from India.

Awards
2014 – Girls Inc. – Strong, Smart & Bold Leader of Distinction
2013 – Bread & Roses Labor of Love Award (In recognition of 12 years of extraordinary generosity and devotion to the Bread & Roses mission of Hope & Healing Through Live Music)
2011 - 100 Black Men of the Bay Area, Inc. - WPO Women of Color Honoree
2 October 1992 – Pennathur was presented the Entrepreneur Award from the Asian Pacific Women's Network at their 11th Anniversary Woman Warriors Awards Dinner, Which was recognized by a Certificate of Commendation by the City of Los Angeles

Non-Profit Boards

 Goodwill San Francisco/San Mateo/Marin - Board of Directors (2020–Present)
Berkeley Rep - Member, Board of Trustees (2016–Present)
 Aquarium of the Bay - Advisor/Ambassador (2018)
 Board Member & supporter (2009–2013)  of Angel Island Conservancy whose focus is to facilitate the preservation, restoration and interpretation of historical and natural resources on Angel Island.
 Sudha is a long time supporter and former Board President of The Redwoods in Mill Valley. The Redwoods is a non-profit active home for seniors in Mill Valley, CA.
 Pennathur has served on the board of Bread and Roses for 6 years, two of those as co-chair. (Bread & Roses is dedicated to uplifting the human spirit by providing free, live, quality shows to people who live in institutions or are otherwise isolated from society.)
 Donor to the Sarvodaya International Trust  The Sarvodaya International Trust aims identify and support those Gandhian institutions and voluntary organizations which are of importance in the context of the objects and doing' laudable and commendable work in the moral, non-violence, peace, communal and racial harmony fields and in the Social, Cultural and Environmental spheres, on Gandhian lines.

Philanthropic Work 
SUDHA'S TREASURES ANNUAL BENEFIT SALE

Since 2004, Sudha has opened a once-a-year holiday store (Sudha's Treasures) that benefits local charities.  100% of the profits are donated to various charities that she supports. Over the past 16 years Sudha has donated over $800,000 to the Bay Area non-profits to benefit our local communities. Past beneficiaries include:

2021
 meemli

2020
 Goodwill San Francisco, San Mateo, Marin
 Parks California

In 2019, Sudha's Treasures benefited:

 Whistlestop
 Marin Villages
 Marin Symphony

In 2018, Sudha's Treasures benefited:

 Berkeley Rep
 Whistlestop
 North Bay Children's Center
 Marin Villages

In 2017, Sudha's Treasures benefited: 
 Equal Rights Advocates
 Whistlestop
 North Bay Children's Center

Previous Years
 Bread & Roses
 The Redwoods
 Angel Island Conservancy
 Gateway Public Schools
 The Friendship Club

She is a founding member of the Kilpennathur School building in Pennathur, India.

References

External links
Pennathur.com – Sudha Pennathur LP. website
Tulsa World - Speaker at women's business leadership conference stresses giving back to community, 5 March 2015
Twin Cities Times - Sudha Sale Sustains, 14 November 2012
The New York Sun - Sudha Pennathur's 'Sari' State, 29 August 2005
Book Excerpt – The four phases of society: where are we going in the 21st century?, Peter Peeters, Greenwood Publishing Group, 1998
Women entrepreneurs:moving beyond the glass ceiling Dorothy Perrin Moore, E. Holly Buttner, Sage Publications, 1997
India Today – Volume 20, Issues 19–24, Thomson Living Media India Ltd., 1995
Our wildest dreams:women entrepreneurs making money, having fun, doing good- Joline Godfrey, HarperBusiness, 1992
Womanpower:managing in times of demographic turbulence Uma Sekaran, Frederick T. L. Leong, Sage, 1992
Book Excerpt – India, the Challenge of Change Pranay Gupte, Methuen/Mandarin, 1989
The Spirit of India in Jewelry –     The Boston Globe (Boston, MA), Julie Hatfield, 4 June 1987
Forbes, Volume 140, Issues 5–9 – Forbes Inc., 1987
Jewel architects are here – The Times of India, Bombay, 4 December 1986
Business India Harvard Business Review, Issues 198–204, A.H. Advani, 1985
Computer decisions, Volume 16 Hayden Pub. Co., 1984

Living people
Businesspeople from Chennai
Businesswomen from Tamil Nadu
Indian jewellery designers
Columbia Business School alumni
University of Washington alumni
Indian women designers
20th-century Indian designers
Artists from Chennai
Women artists from Tamil Nadu
Year of birth missing (living people)
20th-century Indian women